Towry may refer to the following people:
Charles Towry-Law, 3rd Baron Ellenborough (1820–1890), British member of the House of Lords
Charles Towry-Law, 4th Baron Ellenborough (1856–1902), British member of the House of Lords, son of the 4th Baron 
George Henry Towry (1767–1809), Royal Navy officer 
Lanre Towry-Coker (born 1944), Nigerian architect, politician and socialite
Mike Towry, American co-founder of San Diego Comic-Con International 

English-language surnames